Oxford University Association Football Club is an English football club representing the University of Oxford. The club currently plays in the BUCS Football League, the league system of British Universities and Colleges Sport (BUCS). In 2020, the club merged with Oxford University Women's Association Football Club (OUWAFC) to create one single entity.

Oxford University was one of the earliest winners of the FA Cup, having achieved it in 1874 after beating the Royal Engineers.

History 

Formed on 9 November 1871, the club was a giant of the 1870s, winning the FA Cup 2–0 against Royal Engineers in 1874 and finishing the competition as runners-up in 1873, 1877 and 1880, the last year they competed. The club merged with OUWAFC, the women's club, in 2020.

The club left the Iffley Road rugby football ground, which it shared with Oxford University Rugby Football Club, in 1921 and moved to the nearby Iffley Road Stadium.

The club Pegasus of the 1950s was formed from the Oxford and Cambridge University teams.

OUAFC has competed in the British University and College Sports (BUCS) leagues as well as contesting the annual Varsity Football Match against Cambridge University. In 2016, it has seen play Arnaud Trébaol, former player of Royal Excel Mouscron, former Financial Stability Expert at the European Central Bank, and current Economist at Banque de France.

International players

England
Twenty-nine Oxford players were capped for England, including three of the team which took part in the first international match on 30 November 1872: Frederick Chappell, Arnold Kirke-Smith and Cuthbert Ottaway.

The full list of England players (with the number of caps received while registered with Oxford University A.F.C.):

John Bain (1 cap)
Arthur Berry (1 cap)
Francis Birley (1 cap)
W. Blackburn (1 cap)
William Bromley-Davenport (2 caps)
B.O. Corbett (1 cap)
Frederick Chappell (1 cap)
Edmund Currey (2 caps)
Andy Adams (1 cap) 
Reginald Erskine 'Tip' Foster (1 cap)
C.B. Fry (2 caps)
W.E. Gilliat (1 cap)
Henry Hammond (1 cap)
A.F. Hills (1 cap)
K.R.G. Hunt (2 caps)
Elphinstone Jackson (1 cap)
Robert Stuart King (1 cap)
Arnold Kirke-Smith (1 cap)
William Oakley (4 caps)
Cuthbert Ottaway (2 caps)
Percival Parr (1 cap)
E.H. Parry (3 caps)
George Raikes (4 caps)
William Rawson (2 caps)
I.C.F. Ryder (1 cap)
Gilbert Oswald Smith (7 caps)
A.G. Topham (2 caps)
Robert Vidal (1 cap)
Percy Walters (13 caps)
Leonard Wilkinson (2 caps)
Claude Wilson (1 cap)
Charles Wreford-Brown (1 cap)

Wales
The following six players were capped for Wales while registered with Oxford University A.F.C.:
Sydney Darvell (2 caps)
C.H. Davies (1 cap)
William Evans (2 caps)
Alexander Jones (1 cap)
Hugh Morgan-Owen (6 caps)
Morgan Morgan-Owen (11 caps)

Ireland 
The following player was capped for Ireland while registered with Oxford University A.F.C.:

 J.V. Nolan-Whelan (4 caps)

Honours 

FA Cup
 Winners (1): 1874

See also 
 Oldest football clubs

References

External links

 
Football
Association football clubs established in 1872
Football clubs in England
FA Cup winners
University and college football clubs in England
1872 establishments in England